7803 Adachi, provisional designation , is a stony Agnia asteroid from the middle region of the asteroid belt, approximately  in diameter. The asteroid was discovered on 4 March 1997, by Japanese amateur astronomer Takao Kobayashi at the Ōizumi Observatory in central Japan. It was named for Japanese amateur astronomer Makoto Adachi. The S-type asteroid has a rotation period of 5.2 hours.

Orbit and classification 

Adachi is a member of the Agnia family, a very large family of stony asteroids with more than 2000 known members. They most likely formed from the breakup of a basalt object, which in turn was spawned from a larger parent body that underwent igneous differentiation. The family's parent body and namesake is the asteroid 847 Agnia.

It orbits the Sun in the central asteroid belt at a distance of 2.6–2.9 AU once every 4 years and 8 months (1,698 days; semi-major axis of 2.79 AU). Its orbit has an eccentricity of 0.05 and an inclination of 5° with respect to the ecliptic. The first precovery was taken at the U.S. Palomar Observatory in 1953, extending the asteroid's observation arc by 44 years prior to it discovery.

Physical characteristics 

Adachi has been characterized as a stony S-type asteroid by Pan-STARRS photometric survey, which agrees with the Agnia family's overall spectral type.

Diameter and albedo 

According to the survey carried out by the NEOWISE mission of NASA's Wide-field Infrared Survey Explorer, Adachi measures 6.359 kilometers in diameter and its surface has an albedo between 0.251 and 0.2513. The Collaborative Asteroid Lightcurve Link assumes a generic, carbonaceous albedo of 0.057 for all minor planets with a semi-major axis of more than 2.7 AU, and consequently calculates a larger diameter of 10.31 kilometers using an absolute magnitude of 13.66.

Rotation period 

In August 2013, a rotational lightcurve of Adachi was obtained through photometric observations at the Palomar Transient Factory in California. It showed a period of  hours with a brightness variation of 0.31 magnitude.

Naming 

This minor planet was named after Makoto Adachi (born 1953), Japanese amateur astronomer and elementary school teacher from Kyoto. He is the director of the Oriental Astronomical Association and a long-time direct observer of the Solar System's planets, especially Jupiter. The approved naming citation was published by the Minor Planet Center on 6 August 2003 .

References

External links 
 Asteroid Lightcurve Database (LCDB), query form (info )
 Dictionary of Minor Planet Names, Google books
 Asteroids and comets rotation curves, CdR – Observatoire de Genève, Raoul Behrend
 Discovery Circumstances: Numbered Minor Planets (5001)-(10000) – Minor Planet Center
 
 

007803
Discoveries by Takao Kobayashi
Named minor planets
19970304